Cyanea hardyi, known in Hawaiian as hāhā, is a species of flowering plant in the bellflower family, Campanulaceae. This Hawaiian lobelioid is endemic to southern Kauai.

References

External links

hardyi
Endemic flora of Hawaii
Biota of Kauai
Endangered plants